Frederick A. Wing (January 8, 1853 – August 8, 1947) was an American politician in the state of Washington. He served in the Washington House of Representatives from 1895 to 1897.

References

Republican Party members of the Washington House of Representatives
1853 births
1947 deaths
People from Portage County, Ohio